Diego Flores may refer to:

 Diego Flores (footballer) (born 1981), Argentine football manager and former footballer
 Diego Flores (chess player) (born 1982), Argentine chess player
 Diego Flores, Mexican race walker